The U.S. state of Nevada maintains a system of scenic byways throughout the state. Currently, there are 20 designated state scenic byways. Some of these state scenic byways have also been incorporated into national byway designations.

State scenic byways

Nevada's scenic byway program was established by the Nevada Legislature in 1983. The Nevada Department of Transportation is the primary agency responsible for the program, and its director has the authority to add new byways into the system.

As of 2015, 20 road segments throughout Nevada have been designated as state scenic byways. Fifteen of the state's scenic byways overlap with state-maintained highways.

Nationally designated scenic byways
The National Scenic Byways program has four listings in Nevada, including one All-American Road. Additionally, one byway is part of the National Forest Scenic Byway program. All national byway designations comprise one or more of the Nevada scenic byways above.

Gallery

See also

References

External links
 
 Nevada Commission on Tourism

 
Scenic
 Scenic